Ningdu County is a county in the southeast of Jiangxi province, People's Republic of China. It is the northernmost county-level division under the administration of the prefecture-level city of Ganzhou.

The village of Xiaoyuan in Ningdu County was the site of the 1932 Ningdu Conference of the Chinese Communist Party during which Mao Zedong was removed from his leadership positions.

Administrative divisions
In the present, Ningdu County has 12 towns and 12 townships.

12 towns

12 townships

Climate

References

External links
Official website of Ningdu County government

Ganzhou
County-level divisions of Jiangxi